Baby Beluga is a children's music album by Canadian children's entertainer Raffi, released in 1980. The lead song is about a young beluga whale that swims freely. The album begins with the sounds of beluga whales communicating and includes compositions that create images of the ocean and whales at play. An illustrated sing-along book was also published and sold separately as a companion to the first track.

Track listing
"Baby Beluga" – 2:42
"Biscuits in the Oven" – 2:26
"Oats and Beans and Barley" – 1:27
"Day-O" – 3:01
"Thanks A Lot" – 2:28
"To Everyone in All the World" (Traditional) – 1:46
"All I Really Need" – 3:46
"Over in the Meadow" – 2:18
"This Old Man" (Traditional) – 2:25
"Water Dance" – 1:55
"Kumbaya" (Traditional) – 2:23
"Joshua Giraffe" – 6:05
"Morningtown Ride" (Malvina Reynolds) – 2:24

Personnel

 Raffi - Lead vocals, guitar, bells, producer, arranger, mixer
 Ken Whiteley - Guitars, vocals, banjos, accordion, mandolin, organ, piano, percussion, ukulele, mixer, producer
 Chris Whiteley - Trumpet, harmonica
 Dennis Pendrith - Bass, vocals
 Bucky Berger - Drums
 Bruce Cockburn – Guitars, vocals
 Bruce Pennycook - Clarinets, alto saxophone, tenor saxophone, baritone saxophone
 Dick Smith - Drums, percussion, vocals
 Patrick Godfrey - Piano, vocals
 Mike Gardner - Bass
 Grit Laskin - Button accordion, concertina, dulcimer, longneck mandolin, penny whistle
 The Honolulu Heartbreakers – Vocals
 Daniel Lanois - Mixer, engineer
 Children's chorus: Jenny Whiteley, Dan Whiteley, Elizabeth Macay, Chris Thompson

References

1980 albums
A&M Records albums
MCA Records albums
Raffi (musician) albums
Rounder Records albums